Max Joseph Charles (born August 18, 2003) is an American actor. He appeared in the 2012 film The Three Stooges, as young Peter Parker in The Amazing Spider-Man, and had a role in the ABC comedy science fiction series The Neighbors. In 2014, Charles voiced Sherman in DreamWorks' Mr. Peabody & Sherman. He played the recurring role of Spin in Disney XD's Lab Rats: Bionic Island. He voiced Kion on the Disney Junior series The Lion Guard, and Harvey on the Nickelodeon series Harvey Beaks. He also played Zach Goodweather on seasons two through four on the TV series The Strain, replacing Ben Hyland from the first season.

Life and career
Charles was born in Dayton, Ohio on August 18, 2003. He has 3 older brothers, Logan, Brock, and Mason who are also actors. He first appeared in a third-season episode of the HBO series True Blood in 2010. His later television guest starring work includes the Fox series Raising Hope, the NBC series Community, the TV Land series Hot in Cleveland, and the Disney Channel series Jessie. Charles has also had roles in the 2010 television film November Christmas and the 2011 direct-to-DVD film Spooky Buddies.

In early 2012, Charles appeared in The Three Stooges as Peezer, a young orphan who encounters the three title characters. That year, he also appeared in the films Least Among Saints and White Space. In 2012, Charles played a young Peter Parker in The Amazing Spider-Man, a role whose adult counterpart was Andrew Garfield. In fall 2012, Charles began co-starring in the ABC comedy science fiction series The Neighbors. Charles voiced Sherman in DreamWorks Animation's Mr. Peabody & Sherman (2014).

Charles has four brothers, and received his first audition after a producer asked one of his brothers to audition for a role; Charles asked his mother if he could accompany his brother, and was hired for his first acting role. In The Three Stooges, Charles can be seen in a scene with all three brothers. Charles is represented by CESD Talent Agency and Symington Talent Management. In January 2015, he was cast as Zach Goodweather, on the television series The Strain.

He voiced the title character in the Nickelodeon series Harvey Beaks.

He also had a recurring role in the Disney XD TV series Lab Rats as Spin.

Charles voiced Kion on the Disney Channel television film The Lion Guard: Return of the Roar and its subsequent Disney Junior TV series The Lion Guard.

Charles was cast as Ali's best friend in the independent imaginary reality film, Ali’s Realm, which was released in 2020.

Filmography

Television

Film

Accolades

References

External links

2003 births
21st-century American male actors
Male actors from Dayton, Ohio
American male child actors
American male film actors
American male television actors
American male voice actors
Living people